Life Begins is a 1932 American pre-Code drama film starring Loretta Young, Eric Linden, Aline MacMahon, and Glenda Farrell. The film was adapted from the 1932 play of the same name by Mary M. Axelson. It was released by Warner Bros. on September 10, 1932. The film was praised for its honest portrayal of a maternity ward.

The film was remade by Warner Bros. as A Child is Born (1939) and again by Italy's Lux Film as Love Story (1942).

Plot
At a maternity hospital, future fathers pace the corridors while their wives wait for their babies either anxiously or happily. Efficient and compassionate nurse Miss Bowers keeps the ward running smoothly.

Things liven up when Grace Sutton is transferred from the prison where she is being held for murder. Most agree that the man she killed deserved to die, and Nurse Bowers sympathetically allows Grace's concerned husband Jed unlimited time with his wife.

In the ward, the women have varied feelings about motherhood. Mrs. West, a mother of six children, thinks babies are what give meaning to women's lives. In contrast, Florette, a showgirl, just wants to get rid of her twins as soon as possible. Miss Layton has decided opinions about child rearing and has no intention of being a doting mother. While the women debate their various theories, a woman who wants a baby so much that she has become demented wanders in from another ward. An Italian woman quietly sobs when she learns that her newborn has died.

After a touching farewell with Jed, Grace, whose health has suffered from prison conditions, is taken into the labor room. While Jed waits anxiously, Florette is appalled by the plans that the prospective adoptive mother of her twins has concocted. She cradles one baby herself and discovers mother love. Miss Layton has also given up on her progressive plans for her baby.

Down the hall, things are going badly for Grace. When the doctors ask Jed to choose between saving Grace or the baby, he chooses Grace, but she herself insists that the doctors operate and save the baby. After she dies, Jed refuses to see the baby girl, but wise Nurse Bowers places the child in his arms, and as with the mothers, he cannot resist her charms.

Cast

Production
The film's pre-release titles were "Give Me a Child and Woman's Day". The Motion Picture Producers and Distributors of America expressed concern at the directness of the movie's subject, but in 1936, when the Hays Code was being enforced, still considered it acceptable for Warner Bros. to re-release the film. However, a large number of local, state, and international censor boards heavily edited the film or banned it completely. The British Board of Film Censors banned the film.

Reception
Mordaunt Hall of The New York Times wrote in his movie review: "It is a film endowed with fine performances by most of the players; the settings are realistic and the direction is of a high order. There are also some excellent character delineations, but the main thread of the story is disappointing. It is dragged out, and the closing interludes possess little in the way of drama. There is also too much harping on harrowing details."

References

External links
 
 
 
 
 Stills at pre-code.com

1932 films
1932 drama films
American drama films
American black-and-white films
1930s English-language films
American films based on plays
Films directed by James Flood
Films directed by Elliott Nugent
Films produced by Darryl F. Zanuck
First National Pictures films
Films set in hospitals
Warner Bros. films
1930s pregnancy films
1930s American films